Strangea is a genus of three species of shrubs in the family Proteaceae native to Australia.

The type species Strangea linearis was collected by Frederick Strange, at Moreton Bay, Queensland, and described by Carl Meissner in 1855, the author giving an honour to Strange in the naming of the new genus.

Species
Strangea linearis 
Strangea stenocarpoides 
Strangea cynanchicarpa

References

 
Proteaceae genera
Proteales of Australia
Endemic flora of Australia